Yeti is the second studio album by German rock band Amon Düül II, first released in April 1970 on Liberty (Germany: LBS 83359/60 X; United Kingdom: LSP 101) as a double LP. The album was produced by Olaf Kübler and Amon Düül II, and engineered by Willy Schmidt, "with a little help of Siegfried E. Loch". Including both short songs and longer, improvisational tracks, British avant-garde music magazine The Wire describes Yeti as "one of the cornerstones of both Amon Düül's career and the entire Krautrock movement".

Cover art
The cover was designed by the band's organist, Falk Rogner, and features a collage depicting the Grim Reaper (German: Der Sensenmann), made from a photograph of Wolfgang Krischke. Krischke, who had worked with the band as a sound man, had died of hypothermia while under the effects of LSD. Rogner said: "When he died I thought that the photo would be a perfect tribute to his memory. He never managed to find his way into Amon Düül properly when he was alive, so maybe his image as 'Der Sensenmann' will work as a strange cover image and he could be remembered as a magical person."

Part of the cover has been used on the cover of Julian Cope's book Krautrocksampler which provides a personal account of the underground music scene in Germany from 1968 through the 1970s.

Reception

In 2015 Yeti was chosen by Rolling Stone as the 41st greatest progressive rock album of all time. Dan Epstein described it as "one of the finest records of the entire original psychedelic era."

Track listing

The 2001 CD reissue on Repertoire Records includes all the above on a single CD, together with two bonus tracks which were originally the A and B-sides of a 1970 single:

Personnel
 Peter Leopold – drums
 Christian "Shrat" Thierfeld – bongos, vocals
 Renate Knaup – vocals, tambourine
 John Weinzierl – guitar, 12 string guitar, vocals
 Chris Karrer – violin, guitar, 12 string guitar, vocals
 Falk Rogner – organ
 Dave Anderson – bass

Guests on "Sandoz in the Rain":
 Rainer Bauer (from Amon Düül I) – guitar, vocals
 Ulrich Leopold (from Amon Düül I) – bass
 Thomas Keyserling (also recorded with Tangerine Dream) – flute

References

1970 albums
Amon Düül II albums
German-language albums